are a pair of physically separated interchange passenger railway stations, a block from each other, located in Nakahara Ward of eastern Kawasaki, Kanagawa, Japan, operated by East Japan Railway Company (JR East) and the private-sector railway operator Tokyu Corporation.  Note that the term JR East Musashi-Kosugi Station is non-specific, the physical buildings of the Yokosuka and Nambu lines run by the same company are some 400 meters away, connected by a passageway.

Area layout
There are essentially two complexes that make up Musashi-Kosugi Station, with a 400-meter connector passageway between them.  The western complex contains a Nambu Line JR East station and a Tokyu station in one building.  The eastern station is part of the Tokaido Line and contains JR East Yokosuka Line as well as Shinkansen tracks, though the Shinkansen tracks have no stop.  Although it is common to name stations after their operator, the term JR East Musashi-Kosugi Station is therefore non-specific as JR East services both complexes.

Lines
Musashi-Kosugi Station is served by JR East's Nambu Line, Yokosuka Line, and Shōnan-Shinjuku Line, as well as Tokyu's Tōyoko Line and Meguro Line.

JR East

Station layout
JR Musashi-Kosugi Station has two opposed side platforms serving the two tracks (Platform 1 and Platform 2) of the Nambu Line and two side platforms serving the two tracks (Platform 3 and Platform 4) of the Yokosuka Line. The Shōnan-Shinjuku Line and Narita Express share the Yokosuka Line platforms. The two sections of the JR station are located separately and connected by a 400 m long passage. All platforms are elevated, as is the station building. The station has a Midori no Madoguchi staffed ticket office.

Platforms

Tokyu

Station layout
Tokyu Musashi-Kosugi Station has two island platforms serving four tracks. The outer tracks (Platform 1 and Platform 4) are used by the Tokyu Toyoko Line, and the inner tracks (Platform 2 and Platform 3) are used by the Tokyu Meguro Line. All platforms are elevated, as is the station building.

Platforms

History

The area around the station was served by the Nambu and Toyoko lines since the 1920s, but over an extended period of time it was integrated as Musashi-Kosugi Station in 1945. Since then, the station has functioned as a major transfer point for people residing in Kawasaki (along the Nambu Line) who commute to Tokyo.

Although the station was already a major station along the two lines in the 1990s, the station started further expansion of its role when the Meguro Line opened in 2000 with direct service to the Tokyo subway lines. The 2010 opening of the new platform for the Yokosuka Line and Shōnan-Shinjuku Line connected the station with many directions in Kantō region, including Narita Airport.

The nearby  on the Toyoko Line opened on 11 December 1939. The Nambu Railway was nationalized on 1 April 1944, becoming part of into the Japanese Government Railway (JGR) system. Ground-mae Stop became Musashi-Kosugi Station, and the former Musashi-Kosugi Stop was abolished. After the end of World War II, JGR became the Japanese National Railways (JNR). On 16 June 1945, Musashi-Kosugi Station on the Toyoko Line opened, and on 31 March 1953, Kōgyōtoshi Station was abolished.

On 27 November 1988, grade separation work removed the level crossings on Tachikawa-bound tracks, and by 27 December 1988, grade separation work removed the level crossings on Kawasaki-bound tracks. Along with privatization and division of JNR, JR East started operating the former JNR portion of the station on 1 April 1987. On 6 August 2000, the Tokyu Meguro Line opened; the line was extended to connect to the Tokyu Meguro Line on 22 June 2008. The station was further expanded on 13 March 2010, when Yokosuka Line and Shōnan-Shinjuku Line trains began stopping.

Station numbering was introduced on all Tokyu Railway lines during fiscal 2012, with Musashi-Kosugi Station becoming "TY11" for the Toyoko Line and "MG11" for the Meguro Line.

Platform screen doors on the Nambu Line platforms were installed on 2 February 2022 and began operation on 13 March 2022.

On 18 December 2022, platform 3 on the Yokosuka Line was transitioned to a new side platform. Construction of the platform had been in progress since 2020. Under the updated configuration, the platform number assignments remain as-is.

Passenger statistics
In fiscal 2019, the JR station was used by an average of 129,194 passengers daily (boarding passengers only). Passenger usage for the JR East station has almost doubled since fiscal 1999, when the station was the 61st-busiest JR East station with an average of 64,165 passengers daily.

In fiscal 2019, the Tokyu Toyoko Line station was used by an average of 173,414 total passengers daily and the Meguro Line station was used by an average of 49,842 total passengers daily.

The daily passenger figures (boarding passengers only) for each operator in previous years are as shown below.

Surrounding area
The area had until the late 2000s been a rather nondescript 'endless' suburbia, broken up only by the Tama River. At that time, the locals called the area Musako.  However, with skyscraper construction giving the area an urban feel and outsider influx, the new local nickname Kosugi has emerged.  The term Musashi refers to Nambu Line, the first train line through the area, which the line name itself is a reference to former Musashi Province, the southern rim which the line runs along. According to surveys, the district is considered among the more desirable in the Tokyo area, but its popularity waned somewhat after the area suffered flooding due to Typhoon Hagibis in October 2019.

 Nippon Medical School Musashi-kosugi Campus
 Nippon Medical University Musashi Kosugi Hospital
 Todoroki Ryokuchi athletic park

See also
 List of railway stations in Japan

References

External links

 Musashi-Kosugi Station (JR East) 
 Musashi-Kosugi Station (Tokyu) 

Railway stations in Kanagawa Prefecture
Railway stations in Japan opened in 1927
Railway stations in Japan opened in 1945
Nambu Line
Tokyu Toyoko Line
Tokyu Meguro Line
Yokosuka Line
Stations of Tokyu Corporation
Railway stations in Kawasaki, Kanagawa
Shōnan-Shinjuku Line